Intrepid-class gunvessels were a class of six Royal Navy first-class wooden gunvessels built in 1855-56. They were rated as sloops from 1859 to 1862, and were scrapped by 1865.  Victor was sold to the Confederate States of America as the raider CSS Rappahannock, but she was interned by the French at Calais and never fulfilled her intended function.

Design and construction
Designed in 1855, the Intrepid-class gunvessels were intended to serve in the shallow waters of the Black and Baltic seas during the Crimean War. They were built quickly, and of inferior wood, which explains their short lifespan of 10 years.

Propulsion
Twin funnels distinguished them from most other British classes of gunvessel.

Sail plan
The vessels of the class were designed to be barque-rigged, which required less manpower than the traditional full-rigged ship.

Armament
The Intrepid-class gunvessels were designed with one 68-pounder muzzle-loading rifle and four 32-pounder (25cwt) muzzle-loading smoothbore guns.  This armament was later replaced with a single 7-inch/110-pounder breech loader, one 40-pounder breech loader and four 20 pounder breech loaders.

Ships
The first pair were ordered on 18 April 1855, the second pair were ordered on 15 May 1855, and the final pair were ordered on 27 July 1855.  A further two were ordered on 9 April 1856 from Pembroke Dockyard, but were cancelled.

Notes

References

 
 Intrepid
Gunboat classes